Subhashini (born 2 August 1965) is a South Indian films and television actress. Her sister is famous actress Jayasudha. Both of them are nieces of famous actress and director Vijaya Nirmala. She worked with Rajini's Johnny movie's song "Aasaiya Kaathula thoodhu vittu". She shared the screen with her sister in films like Sivaranjani (1978), "Doctor Cine-actor" and Meghasandesam (1983). Subhashini acted in the hit film Arundhati; she played the role of villain's mother. She also acts in serials like Nagaastram (E-TV), Sundarakanda (Gemini TV) and in Sun TV's Chellamay.

Subhashini's daughter Pooja also acted in a film but she gave it up

Partial filmography

Malayalam
 Grihalakshmi (1981) 
 Kallan Pavithran (1981) 
 Aranjaanam (1982) 
 Asthi (1983) 
 Minnaram (1994)

Telugu
 Sivaranjani (1978)
 Maa voollo mahasivudu (1978)
  Urvasi Neeve Naa Preyasi (1979)
 Tiger (1979)
 Prema Kanuka (1981)
 Agni poolu (1981)
 Meghasandesam (1982)
 Doctor Cine Actor (1982)
 Ammayilu Abbayilu (2003)
 Seetayya (2003)
 Cheppave Chirugali (2004)
 Andagadu (2005)
 Tata Birla Madhyalo Laila (2006)
 Samanyudu (2006)
  Anasuya (2007)
 Arundhati (2009)

Kannada
 Fifty Fifty (1984)
 Khadeema Kallaru (1982)
 Ajith (1982)
 Nee Nanna Gellalare (1981) - Guest Appearance
 Urvashi Neene Nanna Preyasi (1979) - Debut movie

Tamil
 Azhage Unnai Aarathikkiren (1979) - Debut in Tamil
 Johnny (1980) (Special Appearance)
 Geetha Oru Shenbagapoo (1980)
 Natchathiram (1980)
 Karumbu Vil (1980)
 Then Situkkal (1984)
 Kondattam (1998)
 Varushamellam Vasantham (2002)
 Boys (2003)
 Thathi Thavadhu Manasu (2003)
 Pakka (2018)

TV serials
 Chinna Chinna Aasai- Ganga
 Nagaastram
 Sundarakanda as Bhanumathi Devi
 Nagamma
 Chellamay as Thaazhaiyamma

References

External links
http://www.idlebrain.com/news/functions/175days-evadigolavadidi/evadigolavadidi50.html
http://www.imdb.com/name/nm0836943/
https://antrukandamugam.wordpress.com/2016/07/11/subhashini/

Telugu comedians
Indian film actresses
Living people
Actresses in Malayalam cinema
Actresses in Kannada cinema
Actresses in Tamil cinema
Actresses in Telugu cinema
Indian television actresses
Actresses in Tamil television
20th-century Indian actresses
21st-century Indian actresses
1958 births